High Terrace is a 1956 black and white British mystery film directed by Henry Cass and starring Dale Robertson, Lois Maxwell, Derek Bond, Eric Pohlmann and Lionel Jeffries.

Plot
Beautiful fledgeling actress Stephanie Blake (Lois Maxwell) is starring in playwright Otto Kellner's (Eric Pohlman) latest theatrical hit. Unbeknownst to her, the writer is in love with her, and is jealous of any competition. Stephanie is ambitious for a part in a new play by American Bill Lang (Dale Robertson), but Kellner refuses to release her from her contract. When Kellner is found stabbed with a pair of Stephanie's scissors, Bill Lang fears she is being framed and so aids her in moving the body. But when the police discover the corpse, everyone becomes a suspect.

Cast

Critical reception
Leonard Maltin gave the film two out of four stars, calling it a "minor drama."

References

External links
 
High Terrace at the British Film Institute

1956 films
British mystery films
Films directed by Henry Cass
Films with screenplays by Norman Hudis
1950s English-language films
1950s British films
1950s mystery films
British black-and-white films